Zimbabwe competed at the 2014 Winter Olympics in Sochi, Russia from 7 to 23 February 2014. Zimbabwe made its debut at the Winter Olympics. The team consisted of a single athlete competing in alpine skiing.

Competitors

Alpine skiing 

According to the final quota allocation released on January 20, 2014, Zimbabwe had one athlete in qualification position. Luke Steyn was born in the country but left at the age of two to Switzerland, where he eventually was exposed to snow and skiing. Steyn finished the men's giant slalom race in 57th position (out of 72 athletes who finished the race). He however failed to complete the slalom race.

References

External links 
Zimbabwe at the 2014 Winter Olympics

Nations at the 2014 Winter Olympics
2014
2014 in Zimbabwean sport